Inverted Image is an album by jazz pianist Chris Anderson which was recorded in 1961 and released on the Jazzland label.

Reception

The Allmusic site awarded the album 3 stars.

Track listing
All compositions by Chris Anderson except where noted.
 "Inverted Image" - 5:55  
 "Lullaby of the Leaves" (Bernice Petkere, Joe Young) - 4:50  
 "My Funny Valentine" (Richard Rodgers, Lorenz Hart) - 4:22  
 "See You Saturday" - 4:31  
 "Dancing in the Dark" (Arthur Schwartz, Howard Dietz) - 4:28
 "Only One" - 3:30  
 "I Hear a Rhapsody" (George Fragos, Jack Baker, Dick Gasparre) - 5:03  
 "You'd Be So Nice to Come Home To" (Cole Porter) - 5:43

Notes
Recorded at Bell Sound Studios in New York City on June 28, 1961 (tracks 4, 7 & 8) and at Plaza Sound Studios in New York City on November 8, 1961 (tracks 1-3, 5 & 6).

Personnel
Chris Anderson - piano
Bill Lee - bass
Philly Joe Jones (tracks 4, 7 & 8), Walter Perkins - drums

References

1961 albums
Chris Anderson (pianist) albums
Jazzland Records (1960) albums
Albums produced by Orrin Keepnews